Giovanni Battista Pozzi was an Italian painter, born at Milan towards the end of the 17th century. He decorated a large number of buildings in the Piedmont, including San Cristoforo at Vercelli.

A pupil of Raffaellino da Reggio, he flourished briefly under the Papacy of Sixtus V. He painted a Christ of the Angels for the church of the Gesu, Rome.

References

External links
Orazio and Artemisia Gentileschi, a fully digitized exhibition catalog from The Metropolitan Museum of Art Libraries, which contains material on Giovanni Battista Pozzi (see index)

17th-century Italian painters
Italian male painters
Painters from Milan
17th-century births
Year of birth unknown
Year of death unknown